The Mack LR  (Low Ride) is a series of heavy-duty (Class 8) trucks built by Mack Trucks. They are a forward control cab-over-engine type, where the driver sits in front of the axle. A flat front has two large windshields. The cab is very low-profile and has dual driving controls with a stand-up driving position on the right side. It is used in refuse service with front, side, and rear-loading refuse compactor bodies. Introduced in 2015 it remains in production in 2020.

The LR is a direct evolution of the 1994 model LE and the upgraded 2007 TerraPro LE. All three models are mechanically and visually similar.

Design 
The LR is a forward control cab-over-engine type. The cab is mounted very low and forward, allowing a step up from the ground to the cab floor of only . It has a stand-up right-side (curb) driving position.

Advanced electronics are used for engine, chassis, and body controls, as well as maintenance. The trucks have ABS. The service brakes can be electrically applied, allowing the driver to exit leaving them on. This system can also shift the transmission into neutral when it is applied. There are locations for a joystick and other controls. Rear-view cameras are often fitted.

Mack builds their own major components (engines, axles, and suspensions) and promotes an integrated design but all LRs use a vendor transmission. Most other vendor components are also available but engine choice is very limited.

Engines
The LR is available with a Mack MP7 diesel and a Cummins Westport natural gas engine. In 2020 an all-electric models was available.

The Mack MP7 is the base engine in the LR. It is a  overhead cam turbocharged inline six-cylinder diesel engine.

The Cummins Westport L9N is a  turbocharged inline six-cylinder natural gas engine.

Transmission
Allison RDS 6-speed transmissions are used on all models. The RDS is a fully automatic planetary gear transmission with a lock-up torque converter.

Frame 
A ladder frame with beam axles is used. Front axles are on semi-elliptical leaf springs. The base rear suspension is a Mack tandem but other axle/suspension types are available. The LR has more frame options than other Mack trucks, with drop frames available.

Dana-Spicer and Meritor supply air brakes, steering systems, driveshafts, and other components.

Axles and suspensions 

Mack powered axles have the drive carrier on top of the housing instead of the front of it like other manufacturers. This lets the driveshafts be in line from the transmission to and between the axles at a higher level above the ground.

Other powered axles are available from Dana-Spicer and Meritor. These have front mounted carriers and in tandems the two axle housings are different.

The Camelback tandem is the base rear suspension. The Camelback has multiple leaves that rock above the bogey pivot then curve down and under the axles.

The mRIDE tandem has tapered leaves that rock above the bogey pivot then go out and above the axles. Struts go from the bottom of the bogey pivot out and under the axle. They have more wheel travel and ground clearance than the camelback.

Vendor tandem combinations can be ordered.

Applications 

Front-loaders have a boom or "arms" that goes from the body over and then down in front of, the cab. Two forks pick up the container.  The container is then lifted up and over the cab to be dumped into a hopper on the top of the body. For curbside pick-up a container is held in a low position and material is loaded into it. It is dumped into the hopper when full then returned to a low position. A large wall the height of the truck is hydraulically moved towards the back of the truck and compresses waste into the body. At the designated disposal site, the wall can move all the way to the back of the truck, and about 6 inches out that back to unload the truck.

Side loaders drive next to bins placed on the curb. They either have a hopper on the side or pick up a bin and dump it into a hopper on the top of the body. A large horizontal packing ram that is anywhere from 6-36 inches tall is hydraulically forced through a small space in between the hopper and truck "body". Waste is compressed until the hydraulic packing ram can no longer move.

Rear loaders have a large hopper on the rear end. They can load bins, cans, and loose material. A large scooping compactor crushes and scoops refuse into the body. Rear loaders are well known in the waste industry for being the "take all" truck.

References

External links 

  Mack index page with links at TrucksPlanet.com

LR
Vehicles introduced in 2015
Class 8 trucks